Hydroboracite is a hydrated borate mineral (hence the name) of calcium and magnesium, whose chemical composition is    CaMgB6O8(OH)6·3H2O. It was discovered in 1834 in the Inder lake, Atyrau Province, Kazakhstan. Hydroboracite is a minor borate ore mineral.

References 

Inoborates
Monoclinic minerals
Minerals in space group 13